The Canal Cafe Theatre is a 60-seat fringe theatre venue in Little Venice, London, specialising in comedy performances.

Location
The theatre is above the Bridge House pub on the corner of Westbourne Terrace Road and Delamere Terrace, at the meeting point of the Grand Union and Regents Canals. It is conveniently accessible from the Warwick Avenue, Royal Oak and Paddington rail stations.

History
The theatre was founded as the residence for NewsRevue and remains its home today, though the show annually transfers to the Edinburgh Festival Fringe.

Other notable performances have been given by The Mighty Boosh, The League of Gentlemen, Waen Shepherd, The Consultants, Rhod Gilbert, Paul Chowdhry, Shappi Khorsandi, Pippa Evans, Sarah Lark, and Frisky and Mannish.

External links
 Canal Café Theatre official site
 NewsRevue official site

Pub theatres in London
Theatres in the City of Westminster
Maida Vale